Hurricane Deck is a short mountain range in Santa Barbara County, California in the Los Padres National Forest. The range lies entirely in the San Rafael Wilderness and separates the drainages of the main stem of the Sisquoc River from its tributary, Manzana Creek. It is the northernmost subrange of the San Rafael Mountains; to the north lies the Sierra Madre Mountains.

The range is a single block of a unique marine sandstone deposit of Miocene age. As such, it possible to view the ridge as a single extremely large mountain (massif).

The ridgeline is traversed by the Hurricane Deck Trail, which is rarely maintained.

References

San Rafael Mountains
Los Padres National Forest
Santa Lucia Ranger District, Los Padres National Forest
Mountains of Santa Barbara County, California
Mountains of Southern California